The Watts Line was a local line of the Pacific Electric Railway that operated between the Pacific Electric Building in Downtown Los Angeles and the Watts Station at 103rd Street in Watts. It was the primary local service for the Southern District, which also included the Long Beach, San Pedro, Santa Ana and Whittier interurban lines. The route operated along the Southern Division's Four Tracks route, with the Watts Line using the outer tracks and the Long Beach line and other limited stop lines using the inner tracks.

History

The local service operated between 1904 and November 2, 1959. The line was quadruple-tracked in 1907. During the 1910s, its service was combined with the South Pasadena Line of the Northern District. From 1938 to 1950, the line was combined with the Sierra Vista Line, which was the main local line in the Northern District. Streetcars were removed and replaced with a parallel bus service on November 2, 1959.

Tracks north of Washington Boulevard were removed or paved over (except a short spur track) after PE service ended. In the late 1980s, the right of way was rehabilitated with one or two tracks used for freight rail (with electrification removed) and two tracks rebuilt to modern light rail specifications. Service along the line between Washington Boulevard and 103rd Street recommenced in 1990 as the Los Angeles Metro Blue Line (renamed the A Line in 2019), with stations at Washington Boulevard, Vernon Avenue, Slauson Avenue, Florence Avenue, Firestone Boulevard, and 103rd Street.

Stops and stations
The following were stops and stations along the Watts line: 
 Pacific Electric Building (6th & Main)
 7th & Main
 8th & Main
 9th & Main
 9th & Los Angeles
 9th & Maple
 STOP (9th between Wall & San Julian Street)
 9th & San Pedro Street
 STOP (9th between Crocker & Towne)
 9th & Stanford
 9th & Kohler
 9th & Central Avenue
 9th & Birch
 9th & Hooper (begin Four Tracks)
 14th Street
 16th Street
 Washington Blvd
 20th Street
 22nd Street
 Amoco Junction – interchange with Air Line
 Adams Boulevard 
 32nd Street
 Jefferson Boulevard (now @ MLK Jr. Blvd)
 38th Street
 40th Street
 Vernon Avenue
 47th Street
 48th Place
 50th Place
 52nd Street
 55th Street
 Slauson Avenue
 Slauson Junction – interchange with Whittier
 Fleming (62nd Street)
 Spaulding (Gage Avenue)
 Merrill Avenue (66th Street)
 68th Street
 Florencita Park (70th Street)
 Florence Avenue
 Ionia (76th Street)
 Nadeau
 Woodside (81st)
 Edgewood Park (83rd Street)
 Graham
 Kent (88th)
 Latin (92nd)
 Elcoat (97th)
 Watts (103rd)

References

External links

Pacific Electric routes
1904 establishments in California
Railway services introduced in 1904
Railway services discontinued in 1958
1958 disestablishments in California
Closed railway lines in the United States